is the third studio album by Japanese singer Yōko Oginome. Released through Victor Entertainment on September 5, 1985, the album features the singles "Koishite Caribbean" and "Kokoro no Mama ni (I'm Just a Lady)". Yasushi Akimoto handled majority of the album's lyrics. It was reissued on March 24, 2010 with four bonus tracks as part of Oginome's 25th anniversary celebration.

The album peaked at No. 27 on Oricon's albums chart and sold over 20,000 copies.

Track listing

Charts

References

External links
 
 
 

1985 albums
Yōko Oginome albums
Japanese-language albums
Victor Entertainment albums